Faux Cyrillic, pseudo-Cyrillic, pseudo-Russian or faux Russian typography is the use of Cyrillic letters in Latin text, usually to evoke the Soviet Union or Russia, though it may be used in other contexts as well. It is a common Western trope used in book covers, film titles, comic book lettering, artwork for computer games, or product packaging which are set in or wish to evoke Eastern Europe, the Soviet Union, or Russia. A typeface designed to emulate Cyrillic is classed as an ethnic typeface. 

Letters are substituted regardless of phonetic matching. For example, R and N in RUSSIAN may be replaced with Cyrillic Я ("ya") and И ("i") to form the faux-cyrillic "ЯUSSIAИ" . Other examples include the use of Ш for W, Ц for U, Я/Г for R/backwards and upside-down L, Ф for O, Д for A, Б, Ь, or Ъ for B/b, З, Э, or Ё for E, Ч or У for Y.  Outside the Russian alphabet, Џ (from Serbian) can act as a substitute for U, Ғ (from Turkic languages) for F, Ә (from Turkic languages, Abkhaz, Dungan, Itelmen, Kalmyk and Kurdish) or Є (from Ukrainian) for E, Ө (from Turkic, Mongolic and Uralic languages) for O, Һ (from Turkic and Mongolic languages and Kildin Sámi) for H, and Ћ (Serbian) for Th. A reversed ☭ is also sometimes used for G. A common substitution is $ for S. Further variants include an inverted K (ꓘ), which is not used in any language.

This effect is usually restricted to text set in all caps, because Cyrillic letter-forms do not match well with lower case Latin letters. In Cyrillic typography, most upright lower case letters resemble smaller upper case letters, unlike the more distinctive forms of Latin-alphabet type. Cursive Cyrillic upper and lower case letters are more differentiated. Most Cyrillic letter-forms were derived from the Greek alphabet in the 9th century, but the modern forms have more closely resembled those in the Latin alphabet since Peter the Great's civil script reform of 1708.

Many versions of Tetris, including those by Atari/Tengen and Spectrum Holobyte, used faux Cyrillic to spell the name as TETЯIS to emphasize the game's Russian origins.  The mockumentary film Borat (stylized as BORДT) makes use of faux Cyrillic; in Russian the word would be spelt Борат.

Characters

The letters А, В, Е, Ѕ*, І*, Ј*, К, М, Н, О, Р, С, Т, Ү*, У, Ғ*, Ѵ*, and Х are strongly homoglyphic or related to Latin letters, depending on intended sound values to the point that their substitution may not be noticed, unlike those listed above. If compatibility issues arise that limit mixing of scripts, these can be used with faux Cyrillic letters in lieu of their Latin counterparts.

See also
 Homoglyph
 IDN homograph attack
 Volapük encoding vice versa of Faux Cyrillic, i.e. encoding of Cyrillic letter with ASCII characters by using faux-Latin homoglyph characters
 Translit, Russian Chat Alphabet, Informal romanizations of Russian
 Foreign branding
 Heavy metal umlaut for a similar practice in the field of heavy metal
 Leet for a similar manner of replacing Latin letters with other glyphs that resemble them
Mimicry/Ethnic Typefaces
 Samples of simulation typefaces
 Transformation of text
 UL Recognized Mark (left-italic ЯU)

References

External links 
 The Backwards R - Explains in greater detail with examples.
 ҒДԞЄ ЯЦSSЇДИ GЄЙЭЯДҐФЯ - A Faux Cyrillic generator that uses lookalikes to replace Latin letters.

Cyrillic script
Macaronic language
Nonstandard spelling
Typography